Riding the Iron Rooster (1988) is a travel book by Paul Theroux primarily about his travels through China in the 1980s. One of his aims is to disprove the Chinese maxim, "you can always fool a foreigner". It won the 1989 Thomas Cook Travel Book Award.

Theroux travelled through China for a year, ending his journey in Tibet after visiting Mongolia, Xinjiang and Manchuria.  He was accompanied by a bureaucrat who acted as a chaperone.

Editions
Riding the Iron Rooster,

References

Books by Paul Theroux
1988 non-fiction books
American travel books
Books about China